The Neajlov is a river in Romania. It is a right tributary of the river Argeș, which it meets near Gostinari, Giurgiu County. It rises from the higher Romanian Plain, east of Pitești.

Location 

The river basin is located in the southern part of Romania, the geographic range being 24°51’12”-26°13’52” E longitude and 43°55’31”-44°49’32” N latitude.

Towns and villages

The following towns and villages are situated along the river Neajlov, from source to mouth: Oarja, Morteni, Petrești, Uliești, Corbii Mari, Vânătorii Mici, Crevedia Mare, Clejani, Bulbucata, Iepurești, Singureni, Călugăreni, Comana.

Tributaries

The following rivers are tributaries to the river Neajlov (from source to mouth):

Left: Neajlovel (I), Neajlovel (II), Izvor, Ilfovăț

Right: Valea Strâmbă, Copăcel, Holboca, Baracu, Chiricanu, Dâmbovnic, Bălăria, Vârtop, Câlniștea, Dadilovăț, Gurban

Lakes 
Lake Comana

History
The Battle of Călugăreni from August 1595 between the Wallachian army led by Michael the Brave and the Ottoman army led by Koca Sinan Pasha, was fought on the banks of the Neajlov.

References

Rivers of Romania
Rivers of Argeș County
Rivers of Dâmbovița County
Rivers of Giurgiu County